The 2012–13 Kazakhstan Hockey Championship was the 21st season of the Kazakhstan Hockey Championship, the top level of ice hockey in Kazakhstan. 10 teams participated in the league, and Yertis Pavlodar won the championship.

Regular season

Playoffs

External links
 Official website

Kazakhstan Hockey Championship
Kazakhstan Hockey Championship seasons
1